Hydon's Ball is a 179m hill covering most of Hydon Heath, Hydestile, Surrey, England

Description
The hill on Hydon Heath, Hydestile reaches 179m and is almost a quarter of the way between Gibbet Hill, Hindhead and Leith Hill in the Greensand Ridge.  

Sometimes known as Hydon Ball, or Cup Hill, it is now in the care of the National Trust. At its highest point is a large stone seat which was placed there in 1915 as a memorial to Octavia Hill, one of the Trust's founders.

It is believed that the term "ball" refers to a signalling station which once stood at the top of the hill.

There is a short poem associated with Hydon's Ball, which may explain its other alternative name:

On Hydon's top there is a cup
And in that cup there is a drop
Pick up the cup, and drink the drop
And place the cup on Hydon's top.

Its slopes are planted with a range of tree species, including native oak, rowan, birch and pine. Two non-native shrubs, Amelanchier and Gaultheria, are said by oral history to have been planted there by landscape gardener Gertrude Jekyll who lived approximately 1.2km to the north at Munstead Wood, Busbridge.

Hydon's Ball is a meeting spot for local Morris Dancers who gather on the hilltop to welcome the first day of spring.

Hydon's Ball is one of the top ten highest points in Surrey.  A drinking water underground reservoir with pressure valves and related capabilities is beneath the summit.

Transport
Though reached through winding roads Hydon's Ball is centred 4.5km south of Godalming which sits by the A3, in central southern England.  The nearest village is south, Hambledon, that has a large public house (The Merry Harriers) and a village shop.

At 1.9km along a road, Milford railway station is nearest to the hill on the direct line between London Waterloo and Portsmouth Harbour. 

Lying on the Greensand Way, the hill can be reached on it from the direction of Godalming/Dorking/Sevenoaks Wealds/Hamstreet and from that of the nearby western end of the ridge, Hindhead.

External links 
 Hydon's Ball and Heath information at the National Trust

Notes and references
Notes 
  
References
 

Hills of Surrey
National Trust properties in Surrey